Ha Tsuen Shi is a village Ha Tsuen, Yuen Long District, Hong Kong.

Administration
Ha Tsuen Shi is a recognized village under the New Territories Small House Policy. For electoral purposes, Ha Tsuen Shi is part of the Ha Tsuen constituency.

History
At the time of the 1911 census, the population of Ha Tsuen Shi was 178. The number of males was 120.

Features
 , also known as Yau Kung Tong, was constructed by the Tang Clan of Ha Tsuen to commemorate their two founding ancestors, Tang Hung-chi and Tang Hung-wai, for establishing the village settlements in Ha Tsuen. Construction of the Ancestral Hall began in 1749 and was completed in 1750. It is a declared monument.
 , a declared monument
 Gate Tower of Ha Tsuen Shi. It was one of the gate towers built for the protection of the Ha Tsuen Shi market. Called the East Gate of the market, it is the only surviving old gate tower of the market. It is a Grade II historic building
 Kwan Tai Temple, a Grade II historic building

References

External links

 Delineation of area of existing village Ha Tsuen Shi (Ha Tsuen) for election of resident representative (2019 to 2022)
 Antiquities and Monuments Office. Hong Kong Traditional Chinese Architectural Information System. Ha Tsuen Shi
 Antiquities and Monuments Office. Historic Building Appraisal. Kwan Tai Temple, Ha Tsuen Shi Pictures
 Antiquities and Monuments Office. Historic Building Appraisal. Gate Tower, Ha Tsuen Shi Pictures

Villages in Yuen Long District, Hong Kong
Ha Tsuen